The Turks in Hungary, also referred to as Turkish Hungarians and Hungarian Turks, refers to ethnic Turks living in Hungary. The Turkish people first began to migrate predominantly from Anatolia during the Ottoman rule of Hungary (1541-1699). A second wave of Ottoman-Turkish migration occurred in the late 19th century when relations between the Ottoman Empire and the Austro-Hungarian Empire improved; most of these immigrants settled in Budapest. Moreover, there has also been a recent migration of Turks from the Republic of Turkey, as well as other post-Ottoman states (such as Bulgaria).

History

Culture

Language
Most Hungarian Turks are bilingual and can speak both Turkish and Hungarian. Moreover, due to the Ottoman rule during the 16th-17th centuries, the Turkish language has also influenced greater Hungarian society; today, there are still numerous Turkish loanwords in the Hungarian language.

Religion 

The Turkish people, alongside the Arabs, make up the majority of the Muslim population in Hungary. Several Ottoman-Turkish historical mosques are used by the Muslim community, including the Yakovali Hassan Pasha Mosque in Pécs, and the Malkoch Bey Mosque in Siklos.

Population
According to the 2001 census, 2,711 inhabitants declared their language under the "Turkish language family", of which, the majority (57.73%) stated that they belonged to the "Ottoman Turkish" ethnicity (1,565). Furthermore, 12 individuals declared to be "Turk" and 91 "Bulgarian-Turkish" (see Bulgarian Turks); the rest declared other Turkic ethnicities. In the 2011 census 5,209 inhabitants declared themselves under "Török nyelvek" ("Turkish languages"); however, the publication does not show the distinction between different Turkic groups.

In addition, there is also approximately 2,500 recent Turkish immigrants from Turkey living in Hungary.

Organizations and associations 
In 2005 the Turkish community, alongside ethnic Hungarian Muslims, established "The Dialogue Platform". By 2012, a new Turkish cultural association the "Gül Baba Turkish-Hungarian Cultural Association" was established in Szentendre, near Budapest.

Notable people 
Zakaria Erzinçlioğlu, Britain's leading forensic entomologist
György Ekrem-Kemál, far-right politician (Turkish father and Hungarian mother)
İbrahim Peçevi, Ottoman historian-chronicler (Turkish father and Bosnian mother)
Can Togay, actor, film director, and creator of the Shoes on the Danube Bank Holocaust memorial

See also 
Ottoman Hungary
Siege of Eger
Gül Baba
Király Baths
Rudas Baths
Hungary–Turkey relations
Hungarian-Turkish Friendship Park
Turanism
Hungarian Turanism
Magyarab
Kaliz

References 

Hungary
Hungary

Ethnic groups in Hungary
Muslim communities in Europe